Robert John Glassey (13 August 1914 – 1984) was a footballer who played in the Football League for Liverpool and Mansfield Town.

Career statistics
Source:

References

1914 births
1984 deaths
Sportspeople from Chester-le-Street
Footballers from County Durham
Association football forwards
English footballers
Darlington Town F.C. players
Liverpool F.C. players
Stoke City F.C. players
Mansfield Town F.C. players
Stockton F.C. players
English Football League players